The Battle of Speyerbach took place on 15 November 1703 in the War of the Spanish Succession. A French army besieging Landau surprised and defeated a German relief army near Speyer.

Prelude 

In mid October 1703, the allied armies prepared to go into winter camp along the Moselle, when Tallard by surprise closed in on Landau and started the siege on 17 October.

On 28 October the allies ordered Crown Prince Frederick of Hesse-Kassel, the future King Frederick I of Sweden, to move south to lift the siege of Landau. Hesse-Kassel would have to cooperate with the Count John Ernst of Nassau-Weilburg, who was on the right bank of the Rhine with 24 battalions and 18 squadrons.

Both armies met on 13 November near Speyer and made camp south of the brook Speyerbach, where Nassau-Weilburg and Hesse-Kassel waited for reinforcements to march to Landau on 16 November.

Tallard had meanwhile decided not to wait for the enemy at Landau, but to march towards them and deliver battle. He ordered troops under Armand, marquis de Pracomtal at Saarbrücken, to join him at Essingen.

Battle 

The German troops were not expecting a French attack and their camp was not planned for defence. Furthermore, the command, including both Hesse-Kassel and Nassau-Weilburg, was gathered in Speyer on 15 November, in order to celebrate the Emperor's name day.

At 07:00 the united French armies marched towards Speyer, where they arrived at 12:00 and deployed until 13:00. The German troops, in absence of their leaders reacted slowly and in confusion. General Vehlen did his best to position the army, but large gaps were left in the left wing.

Tallard ordered 14 squadrons of his right wing to attack. This attack failed to destroy the allied left wing but succeeded in passing through the gaps in their line. At about this moment Nassau-Weilburg arrived on the field and intervened with his cavalry. This led to a defeat of the French cavalry. Instead of disengaging his troops and reforming a line, Nassau-Weilburg pursued the French with his Palatine cavalry on a terrain which was not suitable for horses.

About 14:00 the whole French army attacked. On the left wing the French cavalry was decisively beaten by the allied cavalry. The French lost 19 standards and Pracomtal was killed. In the center the allies held, but on their right wing the French were successful. On the utter right six battalions started by driving Vehlen's cavalry back. It lost its cohesion and fled. The French infantry attacked the Palatine infantry and this fled too.

The French then started to envelop the enemy center. This caused an enormous number of casualties amongst these troops. The remaining German troops retreated in good order and the battle ended when they started to recross the Speyerbach at about 17:00. The French did not hinder them in this operation.

Aftermath 

Tallard achieved one of the biggest French victories of the war. Landau capitulated the same day.

This French victory has been overshadowed in history by their colossal defeat in the Battle of Blenheim nine months later.

References

Sources
 
The Spanish Succession
Die Schlacht bei Speyer (German)

Speyerbach
Speyerbach
Speyerbach
Speyerbach
1703 in Europe
Speyerbach
Speyerbach